Frank Woodrow Wilson (November 29, 1923 – July 8, 2013) was an American businessman, lawyer, and politician.

From Bastrop, Louisiana, Wilson served in the United States Navy during World War II. He then went to the University of Louisiana at Monroe. Wilson graduated from Louisiana State University Law School and practiced law. He also worked in real estate development. Wilson served in the Louisiana House of Representatives 1954-1962 as a Democrat. He was elected city judge of Bastrop, Louisiana 1960–1984.

Notes

1923 births
2013 deaths
People from Bastrop, Louisiana
University of Louisiana at Monroe alumni
Louisiana State University Law Center alumni
Louisiana lawyers
Businesspeople from Louisiana
Louisiana city judges
Democratic Party members of the Louisiana House of Representatives
United States Navy personnel of World War II
20th-century American businesspeople
20th-century American judges
20th-century American lawyers